The Caves of Han-sur-Lesse (in French: Grottes de Han-sur-Lesse or simply Grottes de Han) refers to a natural complex of caves in Belgium. A major Belgian tourist attraction (around 250-300,000 visitors per year), the caves are located in Wallonia, on the outskirts of the village of Han-sur-Lesse.

The caves are formed as the result of an underground erosion of a limestone hill by the river Lesse. For most of its length a meandering river, it abruptly plunges into a sinkhole not far from Han-sur-Lesse.

Cave complex 

Although modern exploration of the complex began in 1771, the cave has been known to locals for much longer. Bronze Age relics have been found inside, indicating use from at least the 5th century BC.

Access is only possible via a vintage streetcar, a remnant of the country's once extensive vicinal tramway system, which departs from the center of Han-sur-Lesse. The guided tour takes about an hour to an hour and a half and includes a sound and light show in one of the largest chambers of the cave and an ending with a simulated cannon shot to demonstrate the cave's acoustic properties. Visitors used to exit the cave by way of a short boat ride at the point where the Lesse emerges on the surface, but since 2009 this has been replaced by a bridge.

Gallery

Bibliography

External links 

 Official website
 Some pictures inside and around the cave

Limestone caves
Show caves in Belgium
Han-sur-Lesse
Landforms of Namur (province)
Tourist attractions in Namur (province)
Rochefort, Belgium